Queen Jane may refer to:

 Jane Seymour (1507/8–1537), third wife of King Henry VIII of England 
 Lady Jane Grey (1537–1554), de facto monarch of England for nine days in 1553
 Queen Jane (musician) (1964/1965–2010), musician from Kenya

See also
 "Queen Jane Approximately", a 1965 song by Bob Dylan